Thomas McClintock can refer to:

 Tom McClintock (born 1956), American Republican politician
 Thomas M'Clintock (1792–1876), American abolitionist
 Thomas McClintock-Bunbury, 2nd Baron Rathdonnell (1848–1929), Anglo-Irish peer, politician and army officer